Live Oak Elementary may refer to one of the following elementary schools:
Live Oak Elementary (Fontana), located in Fontana, California
Live Oak Elementary (Watson), located in Watson, Louisiana